Pterozonium is a genus of ferns in the subfamily Pteridoideae of the family Pteridaceae. Species are mainly found in north-western South America, as well as Costa Rica.

Species
, Plants of the World Online and the Checklist of Ferns and Lycophytes of the World recognized the following species:

Pterozonium brevifrons (A.C.Sm.) Lellinger
Pterozonium cyclophyllum Diels
Pterozonium cyclosorum A.C.Sm.
Pterozonium elaphoglossoides (Baker ex Thurn) Lellinger
Pterozonium lineare Lellinger
Pterozonium maguirei Lellinger
Pterozonium paraphysatum (A.C.Sm.) Lellinger
Pterozonium reniforme (Mart.) Fée
Pterozonium retroflexum Mickel
Pterozonium scopulinum Lellinger
Pterozonium spectabile Maxon & A.C.Sm.
Pterozonium steyermarkii Vareschi
Pterozonium tatei A.C.Sm.
Pterozonium terrestre Lellinger

References

Pteridaceae
Fern genera
Taxa named by Antoine Laurent Apollinaire Fée